Theophilus Bradbury (November 13, 1739September 6, 1803) was a U.S. Representative from Massachusetts. He graduated from Harvard College in 1757; taught school and studied law in Portland; was admitted to the bar and commenced practice in Portland in 1761; moved to Newburyport in 1764 and continued the practice of law; member of the State senate 1791-1794; elected as a Federalist to the Fourth and Fifth Congresses and served from March 4, 1795, until July 24, 1797, when he resigned; appointed justice of the Massachusetts Supreme Judicial Court in 1797. He was elected a Fellow of the American Academy of Arts and Sciences in 1798. Bradbury was a member of the electoral college in 1800.

In February 1802 Bradbury was stricken with paralysis and totally disabled, he was removed from the bench in July 1803.

Bradbury died in Newburyport, Mass., September 6, 1803; interment in Old Hill Burying Ground in Newburyport.

References

Notes

1739 births
1803 deaths
Fellows of the American Academy of Arts and Sciences
Harvard College alumni
Justices of the Massachusetts Supreme Judicial Court
Massachusetts state senators
Federalist Party members of the United States House of Representatives from Massachusetts
People of colonial Massachusetts
People from Newbury, Massachusetts
Burials at Old Hill Burying Ground